The Swedish bandy championship final is a yearly event concluding the bandy season in Sweden and deciding the Swedish bandy champions.

From 1907 to 1930, the finalists were decided from a cup tournament and from 1931 the finalists have been decided from a play-off tournament of the top-tier of the Swedish bandy league system.

The first final was held in 1907, when IFK Uppsala beat IFK Gävle with 4–1 in Boulognerskogen, Gävle.

In 1912, two winners were declared, because no replay of the tied final could be played due to the weather.

Below is a list of finals since 2000.

2000

2001

2002

2003

2004

2005

2006

2007

2008

2009

2010 

Hammarby IF won their first Swedish title after six final losses since 2000 by defeating Bollnäs GIF with 3–1 in a match played with three periods of 30 minutes instead of the normal two halves of 45 minutes due to heavy snow.

2011

2012

2013

2014

2015

2016

2017

2018

See also
List of Swedish bandy championship finals (1907–1949)
List of Swedish bandy championship finals (1950–1999)

References

Swedish bandy championship
Swedish bandy-related lists